Queen's Gardens, Westminster is a garden square in the Bayswater district of the City of Westminster in London.

The square was built in the 1850s along with the rest of the area, another notable garden square being Cleveland Gardens, with all being built by William Frederick Cleveland of Maida Vale who developed many plots in Paddington and Bayswater.

Queen's Gardens was built around 1855.

Notable residents 
 Bishop Charles Ridgeway, 32 Queen's Gardens
 William Thornhill Tucker. Writer and grandson of Governor of Bermuda.  16 Queen's Gardens
 Henry St George Tucker, financier of East India Company. 16 Queen's Gardens
 Sir Henry Seton-Karr, politician and explorer. 11 Queen's Gardens
 Major General Thomas Assheton Duke. 7 Queen's Gardens
 Sir Forrest Fulton, politician. 27 Queen's Gardens

References 

Garden squares in London